Philip Ferns (14 November 1937 – 25 August 2007) was an English footballer who played as a wing half in the Football League.

References

External links
 Philip Ferns' Career

1937 births
English footballers
Footballers from Liverpool
Association football wing halves
AFC Bournemouth players
Liverpool F.C. players
Mansfield Town F.C. players
English Football League players
2007 deaths